Coleophora afrotropicalis is a moth of the family Coleophoridae that can be found in Namibia and South Africa.

References

External links

afrotropicalis
Moths of Africa
Moths described in 2004